Brzeziny may refer to the following places in Poland: 
Brzeziny, a suburb of Olsztyn
Brzeziny, Kuyavian-Pomeranian Voivodeship (north-central Poland)
Brzeziny, Podlaskie Voivodeship (north-east Poland)
Brzeziny, Biłgoraj County in Lublin Voivodeship (east Poland)
Brzeziny, Chełm County in Lublin Voivodeship (east Poland)
Brzeziny, Janów Lubelski County in Lublin Voivodeship (east Poland)
Brzeziny, Krasnystaw County in Lublin Voivodeship (east Poland)
Brzeziny, Lubartów County in Lublin Voivodeship (east Poland)
Brzeziny, Brzeziny County in Łódź Voivodeship (central Poland)
Brzeziny, Kutno County in Łódź Voivodeship (central Poland)
Brzeziny, Poddębice County in Łódź Voivodeship (central Poland)
Brzeziny, Radomsko County in Łódź Voivodeship (central Poland)
Brzeziny, Gmina Rzeczyca in Łódź Voivodeship (central Poland)
Brzeziny, Gmina Mokrsko in Łódź Voivodeship (central Poland)
Brzeziny, Gmina Skomlin in Łódź Voivodeship (central Poland)
Brzeziny, Wieruszów County in Łódź Voivodeship (central Poland)
Brzeziny, Łęczna County in Lublin Voivodeship (east Poland)
Brzeziny, Radzyń Podlaski County in Lublin Voivodeship (east Poland)
Brzeziny, Ryki County in Lublin Voivodeship (east Poland)
Brzeziny, Gmina Lubycza Królewska in Lublin Voivodeship (east Poland)
Brzeziny, Kielce County in Świętokrzyskie Voivodeship (south-central Poland)
Brzeziny, Subcarpathian Voivodeship (south-east Poland)
Brzeziny, Staszów County in Świętokrzyskie Voivodeship (south-central Poland)
Brzeziny, Gostynin County in Masovian Voivodeship (east-central Poland)
Brzeziny, Mińsk County in Masovian Voivodeship (east-central Poland)
Brzeziny, Radom County in Masovian Voivodeship (east-central Poland)
Brzeziny, Warsaw in Masovian Voivodeship (east-central Poland)
Brzeziny, Kalisz County in Greater Poland Voivodeship (west-central Poland)
Brzeziny, Kościan County in Greater Poland Voivodeship (west-central Poland)
Brzeziny, Środa Wielkopolska County in Greater Poland Voivodeship (west-central Poland)
Brzeziny, Kłobuck County in Silesian Voivodeship (south Poland)
Brzeziny, Myszków County in Silesian Voivodeship (south Poland)
Brzeziny, Zawiercie County in Silesian Voivodeship (south Poland)
Brzeziny, Nysa County in Opole Voivodeship (south-west Poland)
Brzeziny, Olesno County in Opole Voivodeship (south-west Poland)
Brzeziny, Pomeranian Voivodeship (north Poland)
Brzeziny, Warmian-Masurian Voivodeship (north Poland)
Brzeziny, West Pomeranian Voivodeship (north-west Poland)